Borghi ( or ) is a comune (municipality) in the Province of Forlì-Cesena,  Emilia-Romagna, Italy.

Borghi borders the following municipalities: Longiano, Poggio Berni, Roncofreddo, Santarcangelo di Romagna, Sogliano al Rubicone, Torriana.

References

External links
 Official website

Cities and towns in Emilia-Romagna